The following is a list of ecoregions in Namibia, according to the Worldwide Fund for Nature (WWF).

Terrestrial ecoregions
by major habitat type

Tropical and subtropical grasslands, savannas, and shrublands

 Angolan mopane woodlands
 Kalahari Acacia-Baikiaea woodlands
 Zambezian Baikiaea woodlands
 Zambezian and mopane woodlands

Flooded grasslands and savannas

 Etosha Pan halophytics
 Zambezian flooded grasslands

Deserts and xeric shrublands

 Kalahari xeric savanna
 Kaokoveld desert
 Nama Karoo
 Namib desert
 Namibian savanna woodlands
 Succulent Karoo

Freshwater ecoregions
by bioregion

Zambezi

 Etosha
 Kalahari
 Karstveld Sink Holes
 Namib Coastal
 Zambezi
 Upper Zambezi Floodplains
 Okavango Floodplains

Marine ecoregions
 Namaqua
 Namib

References
 Burgess, Neil, Jennifer D’Amico Hales, Emma Underwood (2004). Terrestrial Ecoregions of Africa and Madagascar: A Conservation Assessment. Island Press, Washington DC.
 Spalding, Mark D., Helen E. Fox, Gerald R. Allen, Nick Davidson et al. "Marine Ecoregions of the World: A Bioregionalization of Coastal and Shelf Areas". Bioscience Vol. 57 No. 7, July/August 2007, pp. 573-583.
 Thieme, Michelle L. (2005). Freshwater Ecoregions of Africa and Madagascar: A Conservation Assessment. Island Press, Washington DC.

 
Namibia
Ecoregions